The 1948–49 season was the 50th completed season of The Football League.

Final league tables

Beginning with the season 1894–95, clubs finishing level on points were separated according to goal average (goals scored divided by goals conceded), or more properly put, goal ratio. In case one or more teams had the same goal difference, this system favoured those teams who had scored fewer goals. The goal average system was eventually scrapped beginning with the 1976–77 season.

From the 1922–23 season, the bottom two teams of both Third Division North and Third Division South were required to apply for re-election.

First Division

Portsmouth, the 1939 FA Cup winners, won their second major trophy by finishing as champions of the First Division, five points ahead of their nearest challengers Manchester United and Derby County. 

The relegation battle was tighter than those of the previous two seasons. Sheffield United and Preston North End finished the season in the bottom two places, a single point behind Huddersfield Town and Middlesbrough. A mere five points separated the bottom 10 teams in the final table.

Results

Maps

Second Division

Results

Maps

Third Division North

Results

Maps

Third Division South

Results

Maps

See also
1948-49 in English football
1948 in association football
1949 in association football

References
Ian Laschke: Rothmans Book of Football League Records 1888–89 to 1978–79. Macdonald and Jane’s, London & Sydney, 1980.

English Football League seasons
Eng
1